Disch is a surname of German origins. Notable people with the name include:

 Billy Disch (1872–1953), American baseball player and coach
 George Disch (1879–1950) was a pitcher in Major League Baseball
 Rolf Disch (born 1944), German architect, solar energy pioneer and environmental activist
 Thomas M. Disch (1940–2008), American science fiction author and poet
 William Disch (1840–1912), member of the Wisconsin State Assembly

See also
 Disch Promontory, located in Antarctica
 Disch Field, baseball field located in Austin, Texas (Now called Disch-Falk Field)

German-language surnames